The 5th FINA Synchronised Swimming World Cup was held September 12–15, 1991 in Bonn, Germany. It featured swimmers from 10 nations, swimming in three events: Solo, Duet and Team.

Participating nations
10 nations swam at the 1991 Synchro World Cup:

Results

Point standings

References

FINA Synchronized Swimming World Cup
1991 in synchronized swimming
International aquatics competitions hosted by Germany
1991 in German sport
Synchronised swimming in Germany